Regifted Light is the fifth studio album by American singer-songwriter Baby Dee. It was released on March 22, 2011 on the Drag City label. The album was produced by friend and collaborator Andrew WK. The songs were performed on a Steinway D grand piano that WK gave to Dee. The album was recorded in Dee's home with a small backing band.

Track listing

All songs composed by Baby Dee.

"Cowboys with Cowboy Hat Hair" – 3:45
"Yapapipi" – 5:17
"Regifted Light" – 3:09
"Coughing Up Cat Hair" – 1:33
"Deep Peaceful" – 2:08
"Brother Slug and Sister Snail" – 4:54
"Lullaby Parade" – 2:53
"On the Day I Died" – 2:50
"Horn Pipe" – 0:45
"The Pie Song" – 2:13
"Cowboy Street" – 1:16
"The Move" – 2:50

Personnel
Baby Dee – piano, vocals
Andrew WK – pump organ, percussion
Matthew Robinson – cello
Mark Messing – tuba, sousaphone, bassoon
Jon Steinmeir – glockenspiel, danmo, melodica, percussion

References

2011 albums
Baby Dee albums
Drag City (record label) albums